Miloslav Charouzd (15 August 1928 in Prague – 25 June 2001 in Prague) was a Czech ice hockey player who competed in the 1952 Winter Olympics.

References

External links

1928 births
2001 deaths
Czech ice hockey left wingers
Olympic ice hockey players of Czechoslovakia
Ice hockey players at the 1952 Winter Olympics
Ice hockey people from Prague
HC Sparta Praha players
Czechoslovak ice hockey left wingers